The following is an incomplete list of association football clubs based in Sudan.
For a complete list see :Category:Football clubs in Sudan

A
Al Khartoum SC
Al Mirghani ESC
Al Nile SC (Al-Hasahesa)
Al Rabta
Al-Ahli (Atbara)
Al-Ahli Khartoum
Al-Ahli SC (Wad Madani)
Al-Ahly Shendi
Al-Hilal Club (Omdurman)
Al-Hilal SC (Port Sudan)
Al-Hilal SC Kadougli
Al-Ittihad SC (Wad Madani)
Al-Merreikh (Al-Fasher)
Al-Merreikh Al-Thagher
Al-Nsoor
Al-Shamali AC
Alamal SC Atbara

B
Burri Khartoum

H
Hay el-Arab SC

J
Jazeerat Al-Feel SC

M
Merrikh
Mourada

T
Taka Kassala

External links
Sudan Premier League - soccerway.com

 
Sudan
Football
Football